Košarkaški klub Novi Sad, commonly referred to as КK Novi Sad, was a men's professional basketball club based in Novi Sad, Serbia. In their last five seasons, the club played in the Basketball League of Serbia. Their home arena was the SPC Vojvodina.

History 

The club participated at the 2003 PBA Invitational Championship in Pasay, organized by the Philippine Basketball Association. They played with FedEx Express, Red Bull Barako, Talk 'N Text Phone Pals, and the Yonsei Eagles in Group A; finished the fourth with a 1–3 record.

In August 2011, the club was merged into Vojvodina Srbijagas. The merger was done to help strengthen the financial position of the clubs.

Sponsorship naming
The club has had several denominations through the years due to its sponsorship:
 NAP Novi Sad: 1994–1997
 Novi Sad Panonska banka: 2007–2011

Players

Coaches 

  Aleksandar Kaplarević (1994–1995)
  Radomir Kisić (2008)
  Nemanja Danilović (2008–2010)
  Siniša Matić (2010–2011)

Season by season

Notable players 

  Bogić Vujošević
  Marko Šutalo
  Marko Jagodić-Kuridža
  Mileta Lisica
  Nikola Kalinić
  Branko Vukićević
  Milan Gurović
  Željko Rebrača

References

External links
 KK Novi Sad at srbijasport.net
 KK Novi Sad at eurobasket.com

Novi Sad
Basketball teams established in 1985
Basketball teams disestablished in 2011
Sport in Novi Sad
1985 establishments in Yugoslavia